Brădişor Dam is a large hydroelectric dam on the Lotru River situated in Romania.

The dam generates 223 GWh of electricity per year.

See also

Porţile de Fier I
Porţile de Fier II

External links
Description 

Hydroelectric power stations in Romania
Dams in Romania